Kyle Edmund was the defending champion but chose not to defend his title.

Darian King won the title after defeating Mitchell Krueger 6–2, 6–3 in the final.

Seeds

Draw

Finals

Top half

Bottom half

References
 Main Draw
 Qualifying Draw

Levene Gouldin and Thompson Tennis Challenger – Singles
2016 Singles
2016 Levene Gouldin & Thompson Tennis Challenger